The 1932 United States presidential election in Vermont took place on November 8, 1932, as part of the 1932 United States presidential election which was held throughout all contemporary 48 states. Voters chose three representatives, or electors to the Electoral College, who voted for president and vice president. 

Vermont voted for the Republican nominee, incumbent President Herbert Hoover of California, over the Democratic nominee, Governor Franklin D. Roosevelt of New York. Hoover's running mate was incumbent Vice President Charles Curtis of Kansas, while Roosevelt ran with incumbent Speaker of the House John Nance Garner of Texas.

Hoover took 57.66% of the vote to Roosevelt’s 41.08%, a margin of 16.58%.

Vermont historically was a bastion of liberal Northeastern Republicanism, and by 1932 the Green Mountain State had gone Republican in every presidential election since the founding of the Republican Party. From 1856 to 1928, Vermont had had the longest streak of voting Republican of any state, having never voted Democratic before, and this tradition continued even in the midst of a nationwide Democratic landslide in 1932.

Vermont was 1 of only 6 states, four of them in New England, which voted to re-elect the embattled Republican incumbent Hoover, who was widely unpopular over his failure to adequately address the Great Depression. Vermont would ultimately be one of only two states (along with nearby Maine) that would reject FDR in all four of his presidential campaigns.

In terms of both vote share and margin, Vermont was the most Republican state in the nation. Vermont would weigh in as a whopping 34% more Republican than the national average in the 1932 election.

Hoover carried eleven of the state’s 14 counties, breaking sixty percent in seven. However, the three northwestern counties of Vermont would become New Deal Democratic enclaves in an otherwise Republican state. In 1928, Al Smith had become the first ever Democrat to win Chittenden County, the state’s most populous county and home to its largest city, Burlington. In 1932, Roosevelt would carry Chittenden County for the Democrats as Smith did in 1928, but also flip Franklin County and Grand Isle County into the Democratic column. All three counties would remain loyally Democratic in the elections that followed until Dwight Eisenhower’s Republican landslide of 1952.

Results

Results by county

See also
 United States presidential elections in Vermont

References

Vermont
1932
1932 Vermont elections